N'Koumandougou is a rural commune in the Cercle of Ségou in the Ségou Region of Mali. The commune contains 15 villages in an area of approximately 2,040 square kilometers. In the 2009 census it had a population of 14,237.  The chef-lieu is the village of Doura.

References

External links
.
.

Communes of Ségou Region